Nik Ahmad Fadly bin Nik Leh (born 28 May 1977) is a Malaysian former professional footballer who currently serves as Kelantan FA U19 assistant coach.

Career

Coaching
In 2013, Nik Fadly has been appointed as an assistant coach for Kelantan FA U19 team and Tengku Hazman Raja Hassan as the head coach.

Club career
Nik Fadly spent most of his professional career playing for Kelantan FA. He also used to play with Kuala Lumpur FA, Malacca FA and TNB Kelantan FC. He was also in the Olympic 2000 team that were playing in the Malaysian League for the 1998 season.

National team
Nik Ahmad Fadly's sole Malaysia senior team appearance came in 2001, in the 2001 Merdeka Tournament group game against Bahrain.

He was in the Malaysia national under-21 football team that competes in the 1997 FIFA World Youth Championship, held in Malaysia. He scores the only goal for Malaysia in the tournament in a 1-3 loss against Uruguay, as Malaysia exited the tournament in group stage having lost all 3 group games.

Personal life
His father, Nik Leh, was also a footballer for TNB Kelantan FC and Kelantan FA in the 1970s.

External links

References

1977 births
Living people
Malaysian footballers
Malaysia international footballers
Malaysian people of Malay descent
Kelantan FA players
Kuala Lumpur City F.C. players
People from Kota Bharu
People from Kelantan
Association football midfielders